Conner, officially the Municipality of Conner, , is a 2nd class municipality in the province of Apayao, Philippines. According to the 2020 census, it has a population of 27,552 people.

Geography

According to the Philippine Statistics Authority, the municipality has a land area of  constituting  of the  total area of Apayao.

The town was named after Norman Conner, an American engineer who oversaw the construction of the main roads within the province of Apayao, effectively ending the isolation of the province from the outside world during the early American era.

Barangays
Conner is politically subdivided into 21 barangays. These barangays are headed by elected officials: Barangay Captain, Barangay Council, whose members are called Barangay Councilors. All are elected every three years.

Climate

Demographics

In the 2020 census, Conner had a population of 27,552.

Economy

Government
Conner, belonging to the lone congressional district of the province of Apayao, is governed by a mayor designated as its local chief executive and by a municipal council as its legislative body in accordance with the Local Government Code. The mayor, vice mayor, and the councilors are elected directly by the people through an election which is being held every three years.

Elected officials

References

External links

 [ Philippine Standard Geographic Code]

Municipalities of Apayao